Little Donkey is a popular Christmas carol, written by British songwriter Eric Boswell in 1959, which describes the journey by Mary the mother of Jesus to Bethlehem on the donkey of the title.

The first version to chart was by Gracie Fields, followed a fortnight later by The Beverley Sisters, who overtook her in the charts by Christmas.  The song became No. 1 in the UK Sheet Music Chart from mid November 1959 until the end of the year, and a recording by Nina & Frederik reached No. 3 the following Christmas.

The song has also been recorded by Vera Lynn, Aled Jones and many others, and it is a traditional part of the festive season and nativity plays for many young children.

In the 21st century the song has become something of a signifier of childhood Christmas in popular culture having featured in the comedy acts of Alan Carr, Russell Brand and especially in The Ricky Gervais Show which featured a running gag about Karl Pilkington's drum performance of the song.

See also
 List of Christmas carols

References

Christmas carols
English Christian hymns
Songs about mammals
20th-century hymns
Gracie Fields songs